The 1969 Boston Red Sox season was the 69th season in the franchise's Major League Baseball history. With the American League (AL) now split into two divisions, the Red Sox finished third in the newly established American League East with a record of 87 wins and 75 losses, 22 games behind the Baltimore Orioles, who went on to win the AL championship.

Dick Williams, who had managed the team to the 1967 AL pennant, was fired on September 23; coach Eddie Popowski led the team for the final nine games of the season.

Offseason 
 October 15, 1968: Joe Foy was drafted by the Kansas City Royals from the Boston Red Sox as the 4th pick in the 1968 expansion draft.
 March 18, 1969: Bill Kelso was purchased by the Red Sox from the Cincinnati Reds.
 March 29, 1969: Bill Kelso was returned to the Reds by the Red Sox.

Regular season

Season standings

Record vs. opponents

Notable transactions 
 April 19, 1969: Dick Ellsworth, Ken Harrelson and Juan Pizarro were traded by the Red Sox to the Cleveland Indians for Joe Azcue, Vicente Romo and Sonny Siebert.
 June 15, 1969: Joe Azcue was traded by the Red Sox to the California Angels for Tom Satriano.

Opening Day lineup 

Source:

Roster

Statistical leaders 

Source:

Batting 

Source:

Pitching 

Source:

Awards and honors 
Carl Yastrzemski, Gold Glove Award (OF)

Farm system 

Source:

References

External links 
1969 Boston Red Sox team page at Baseball Reference
1969 Boston Red Sox season at baseball-almanac.com

Boston Red Sox seasons
Boston Red Sox
Boston Red Sox
1960s in Boston